Oldbury may refer to:

People
Oldbury (surname)

Places
Oldbury, Shropshire, a village near Bridgnorth, England
Oldbury-on-Severn, a village in Gloucestershire, England
Oldbury nuclear power station, under decommissioning since 2012
Oldbury-on-the-Hill, a village and former civil parish in Gloucestershire, England
Oldbury, Warwickshire, a hamlet in Hartshill parish, Warwickshire, England
Oldbury, West Midlands, a town in the Metropolitan Borough of Sandwell, England
Oldbury Railway, a former branch line
Oldbury railway station
Oldbury United F.C.
Oldbury, Western Australia, a district south of Perth, Australia
Oldbury Naite, a village in South Gloucestershire, England

Other uses
Oldbury Court Estate, a park in Bristol
Oldbury Hillfort, an Iron Age hillfort on Cherhill Downs, Wiltshire
Oldbury Camp, an Iron Age hillfort near Ightham, Kent
Oldbury rock shelters, Palaeolithic rock shelters
Oldberry Castle, sometimes called Oldbury Castle, an Iron Age hillfort in Somerset